Sterling Davis (born October 27, 1977 in Dallas, Texas, USA) is a retired basketball player and former head coach of British Basketball League club Glasgow Rocks from 2007 to 2017.

A 6' 7" power forward, Davis signed for the Rocks in 2006, after spells with fellow British sides Sheffield Sharks (2004–2006), London Towers (2003) and Brighton Bears (2001–2003), where he was a BBL All Star in 2002 and runner-up league MVP whilst gaining all-league team nods in 2002 and 2003. He scored a career-high 42 points on March 1, 2011 in a game against the Guildford Heat. He spent the 2000–1 season with Uruguayan team Aguada and Argentine club Central Entrerriano.

Originally appointed as player-coach in Glasgow in 2007, Davis retired from playing in 2015 to focus solely on coaching. He left the Rocks in  May 2017 after reaching four major finals during his tenure.

Davis played NCAA college basketball at Tulane University., finishing his four years with averages of 17.7 points and 3.6 rebounds. He holds UK and USA citizenship.

References

Living people
1977 births
Basketball coaches from Texas
American emigrants to England
American expatriate basketball people in the United Kingdom 
Basketball players from Texas
Brighton Bears players
British men's basketball players
Glasgow Rocks players
London Towers players
Naturalised citizens of the United Kingdom
People from Duncanville, Texas
Sheffield Sharks players
Tulane Green Wave men's basketball players
American men's basketball players
American expatriate basketball people in Uruguay
American expatriate basketball people in Argentina
American expatriate sportspeople in Scotland
American expatriate sportspeople in England
American expatriate basketball people in Germany
British basketball coaches
Naturalised sports competitors